(Thomas) Gerald Case (1905 – 22 May 1985) was a British film and television actor known for his role
in the 1976 Wodehouse Playhouse episode, 'Strychnine in the Soup'.

He was the son of Captain Thomas Elphinstone Case, of the Coldstream Guards, and Evelyn Ruby, daughter of Adolphus Ferguson. His widowed mother subsequently married the England cricketer and gold medal-winning Olympic boxer J. W. H. T. Douglas.

Case lived at Mayfield, Windlesham, Surrey, where he died on 22 May 1985.

Partial filmography

 Museum Mystery (1937) - Peter Redding
 The Lion Has Wings (1939) - Unnamed Character
 In Which We Serve (1942) - Jasper
 Henry V (1944) - Earl of Westmoreland
 Caesar and Cleopatra (1945) - Roman Tax Officer (uncredited)
 Night Boat to Dublin (1946) - Inspector Emerson
 I See a Dark Stranger (1946) - Colonel Dennington
 Jean's Plan (1946) - Inspector of Police
 When the Bough Breaks (1947) - Doctor
 Man on the Run (1949) - Constable on Waterloo Bridge
 Now Barabbas (1949) - King
 Landfall (1949) - S / Ldr. Peterson
 Meet Simon Cherry (1949) - Dr. Smails
 The Man in Black (1949) - Doctor
 Golden Arrow (1949) - 1st Military policeman
 Stage Fright (1950) - Policeman (uncredited)
 The Dancing Years (1950) - Rudi's Secretary
 Traveller's Joy (1950) - 2nd Swedish Reporter (uncredited)
 Assassin for Hire (1951) - Detective Sgt. Stott
 Cloudburst (1951) - Doctor
 Hunted (1952) - Deputy Assistant Commissioner
 Home at Seven (1952) - Sergeant Evans
 Wide Boy (1952) - Detective Sgt Stott
 The Fake (1953) - Peter Randall
 Final Appointment (1954) - Australian Official
 Lady of Vengeance (1957) - Hawley
 The Flying Scot (1957) - Guard
 Barnacle Bill (1957) - Commander
 The Safecracker (1958) - Car Salesman
 The Carringford School Mystery (1958) - Mr. Ashworth
 The Lady Is a Square (1959) - (uncredited)
 Horrors of the Black Museum (1959) - Bookshop Manager
 The Heart of a Man (1959) - Theatre Manager (uncredited)
 A Touch of Larceny (1960) - Club Member
 Invasion Quartet (1961) - Medical Board Officer (uncredited)
 80,000 Suspects (1963) - Chief Administration Officer (uncredited)
 Bomb in the High Street (1963) - Ventry
 Ladies Who Do (1963) - 3rd Businessman (uncredited)
 Accidental Death (1963) - Police Inspector
 The Third Secret (1964) - Mr. Bickes
 Runaway Railway (1966)
 Vampyres (1974) - Estate Agent
 Rachel and the Beelzebub Bombardiers (1977) - (uncredited)
 The Elephant Man (1980) - Lord Waddington

References

External links

1905 births
1985 deaths
British male film actors
20th-century British male actors